Masdevallia caudata is a species of orchid endemic to easternmost Colombia and adjacent Venezuela.

References

External links 

caudata
Orchids of Colombia
Orchids of Venezuela